The XIV Army Corps / XIV AK was a corps level command of the German Army before and during World War I. It was, effectively, also the army of the Grand Duchy of Baden, which, in 1871, had been integrated into the Prussian Army command structure, as had the armies of most German states. Both divisions and the bulk of the corps' support units were from the grand duchy. The corps was established in 1870, after the Siege of Strasbourg.

It was assigned to the V Army Inspectorate, which became the 7th Army at the start of the First World War. It was still in existence at the end of the war as part of the 18th Army, Heeresgruppe Deutscher Kronprinz on the Western Front.

Franco-Prussian War 
A siege corps was formed to besiege Strasbourg during the Franco-Prussian War under the command of General der Infanterie August von Werder. After the fall of Strasbourg, these troops were formed into a new XIV Corps by the All-highest Cabinet Order (Allerhöchste Kabinettsorder, AKO) of 30 September 1870.

Werder defeated the French at Dijon and at Nuits and proceeded to besiege Belfort. General Charles Denis Bourbaki assembled an army intending to relieve Belfort, leading to the Battle of Villersexel. On 15 January 1871, Bourbaki attacked Werder along the Lisaine River; however, after a three-day battle, he was repelled and his army retreated into Switzerland.

XIV Corps was disbanded in March 1871.

Re-formation 
After the peace treaty, the XIV Corps was re-established on 1 July 1871 almost exclusively with troops from the Grand Duchy of Baden.

It was assigned to the V Army Inspectorate, but joined the 7th Army at the start of the First World War.

Peacetime organisation 
The 25 peacetime Corps of the German Army (Guards, I - XXI, I - III Bavarian) had a reasonably standardised organisation. Each consisted of two divisions with usually two infantry brigades, one field artillery brigade and a cavalry brigade each. Each brigade normally consisted of two regiments of the appropriate type, so each Corps normally commanded 8 infantry, 4 field artillery and 4 cavalry regiments. There were exceptions to this rule:
V, VI, VII, IX and XIV Corps each had a 5th infantry brigade (so 10 infantry regiments)
II, XIII, XVIII and XXI Corps had a 9th infantry regiment
I, VI and XVI Corps had a 3rd cavalry brigade (so 6 cavalry regiments)
the Guards Corps had 11 infantry regiments (in 5 brigades) and 8 cavalry regiments (in 4 brigades).
Each Corps also directly controlled a number of other units. This could include one or more 
Foot Artillery Regiment
Jäger Battalion
Pioneer Battalion
Train Battalion

14th (Baden) Foot Artillery was partially garrisoned in Straßburg (as part of XV Corps) and Müllheim (as part of XIV Corps). In addition, the 66th (4th Baden) Field Artillery was stationed in Lahr and Neubreisach as part of XV Corps.

World War I

Organisation on mobilisation 
On mobilization on 2 August 1914, the Corps was restructured. The 28th Cavalry Brigade was withdrawn to form part of the 6th Cavalry Division and the 29th Cavalry Brigade was broken up and its regiments assigned to the divisions as reconnaissance units. The divisions received engineer companies and other support units from the Corps headquarters. Unusually, the Corps retained its 5th Infantry brigade, making it the strongest active corps on mobilisation. In summary, XIV Corps mobilised with 30 infantry battalions, 10 machine gun companies (60 machine guns), 8 cavalry squadrons, 24 field artillery batteries (144 guns), 4 heavy artillery batteries (16 guns), 3 pioneer companies and an aviation detachment.

Combat chronicle 
At the outbreak of World War I, the Corps was assigned to the 7th Army on the left of the forces that executed the Schlieffen Plan and fought in the Battle of the Frontiers. In September, it was transferred to the 6th Army. From November 1916 to March 1917, the corps took command of Group Hardaumont of the 5th Army. In March 1917, it was transferred to the 3rd Army and took command of Group Prosnes. In May, it was transferred to the 4th Army's control and took command of Group Dixmude. During this period, it fought in the Battle of Passchendaele. Taking over from the XIX Corps at Wijtschate in November 1917, the XIV Corps formed a new Group Wytschaete, which it commanded until December 1917, after which it took over Group Busigny in the 6th Army. It remained in command of this group into 1918.

It was still in existence at the end of the war as part of the 18th Army, Heeresgruppe Deutscher Kronprinz on the Western Front.

Commanders 
The XIV Corps had the following commanders during its existence:

See also 

Armee-Abteilung B
German Army order of battle (1914)
German Army order of battle, Western Front (1918)
List of Imperial German infantry regiments
List of Imperial German artillery regiments
List of Imperial German cavalry regiments

References

Bibliography 
 Claus von Bredow, bearb., Historische Rang- und Stammliste des deutschen Heeres (1905)
 
 
 

 
 

Corps of Germany in World War I
Military of the Grand Duchy of Baden
Military units and formations established in 1870
Military units and formations disestablished in 1871
Military units and formations established in 1871
Military units and formations disestablished in 1919